Bagley is a surname.

Notable people with this name include
 Ben Bagley (1933–1998), American musical theatre and record producer
 David W. Bagley (1883–1960), Admiral in the United States Navy during World War II
 Desmond Bagley (1923–1983), British journalist and novelist
 Edward Bagley (1876-1961), British soldier and politician
 Edwin Eugene Bagley (1857–1922), American composer
 Florence Bagley (born 1874), American psychologist
 Frances Bagley (born 1946), American sculptor 
 George A. Bagley (1826–1915), United States Representative from New York
 George R. Bagley (1871–1939), American attorney and jurist in Oregon
 Harry T. Bagley (1874–1919), American attorney and politician and mayor of Hillsboro, Oregon
 James W. Bagley (1881–1947) was an American aerial photographer, topographic engineer and inventor.
 John Bagley (basketball) (born 1960), American basketball player in the National Basketball Association
 John H. Bagley Jr. (1832–1902), United States Representative from New York
 John J. Bagley (1832–1881), American politician and Governor of Michigan
 Larry Bagley (born 1949), American politician and Louisiana state representative
 Mark Bagley (born 1957), American comic book artist
 Marvin Bagley III (born 1999), basketball player
 Melville Sewell Bagley (1838–1880), American businessman who lived most of his life in Argentina
 Pat Bagley (born 1956), American editorial cartoonist and journalist
 Rodney Bagley (born 1934), American co-inventor of the catalytic converter 
 Ross Bagley (born 1988), American actor
 Thomas Bagley (priest) (before 1430–1431), priest in England in the fifteenth century
 Thomas Bagley (footballer), English professional footballer in the 1930s
 Tom Bagley (born 1939), American former driver in the USAC and CART Championship Car series
 Will Bagley (1950-2021), Utah historian
 William Bagley (educator) (1874–1946), American educator and editor
 William Bagley (footballer) (before 1933 – after 1941), English association football player
 Worth Bagley (1874–1898), American naval officer and the only United States Navy officer killed in action during the Spanish–American War

References

English toponymic surnames